is a railway station on the Aoimori Railway Line in the city of Hachinohe in Aomori Prefecture, Japan, operated by the third sector railway operator Aoimori Railway Company.

Location
Kitatakaiwa Station is served by the Aoimori Railway Line, and is 21.0 kilometers from the terminus of the line at Metoki Station. It is 638.3 kilometers from Tokyo Station.

Surrounding area

Mabechi River

History
Kitatakaiwa Station was opened on 10 August 1923 as a station of the Tōhoku Main Line on the Japan National Railways (JNR). Freight operations were discontinued from April 1962. The station has been unattended since May 1980. With the privatization of the JNR on 1 April 1987, it came under the operational control of the East Japan Railway Company (JR East). It came under the control of the Aoimori Railway Company on 1 December 2002.

Station layout
Kitatakaiwa Station has a one ground-level island platform and one ground-level side platform serving three tracks connected to the station building by a footbridge. However, only tracks 1 and 3 are in use, and track 2 is used as a siding. The station building is not staffed.

Platforms

See also
List of railway stations in Japan

References

External links

 

Railway stations in Japan opened in 1923
Railway stations in Aomori Prefecture
Aoimori Railway Line
Hachinohe